Palh is a village in Mahendragarh tehsil, Mahendragarh district, Haryana state, India.

References

Villages in Mahendragarh district